Area codes 304 and 681 are telephone area codes in the North American Numbering Plan (NANP) for the entirety of the U.S. state of West Virginia. The numbering plan area was established in October 1947 with area code 304, as one of the eighty-six original North American area codes. Area code 681 was added to the same area in an overlay plan that took effect on March 28, 2009.

History
Due to West Virginia's low population, the state was one of the last remaining states with only one area code in the early 21st century. With the growth of telecommunication services, in particular proliferation of cell and mobile phones and fax machines, news reports in 2007 indicated that West Virginia would soon need a new area code.

On January 29, 2008, the West Virginia Public Service Commission voted 2-1 for a split of numbering plan area 304, while commission chairman Michael Albert dissented in favor of an overlay. The proposed split had Charleston and points south (Huntington, Bluefield, Beckley) staying with area code 304, while the northern and eastern portions of the state (Wheeling, Morgantown, Clarksburg, Parkersburg) would have received a new area code. Telecommunications service providers were in favor of an overlay, instead of a split. They wanted to spare their northern West Virginia customers, particularly in rural areas, the burden of having to change telephone numbers, which would have required reprogramming of all cell phones. An overlay would have had the effect of assigning a total of 15.6 million telephone numbers to a state of just over 1.8 million people.

Over the following two weeks, numerous state and local government officials and various business interests voiced strong opposition to a split, in favor of the overlay option. Governor Joe Manchin voiced his support of an overlay. Several telecommunications providers officially appealed to the Public Service Commission for an overlay, which was unanimously approved by all three commissioners on February 13, 2008. It was the first example of an entire state previously served by a single code installing an overlay plan. This example has since been followed by Idaho, where area code 208 was overlaid with 986 in 2017.

At one time, 932 was reserved for use as a future area code in West Virginia, but there has since been a 304-932 exchange code assigned in Charleston. West Virginia is not projected to need another area code in the foreseeable future.

Implementation details of the new area code were announced in NANPA Planning Letter #375 in March 2008. Permissive ten-digit local dialing of numbers in the existing 304 area code began no later than July 26, 2008. During this period, local 304 calls could still be dialed with just seven digits. Mandatory ten-digit local dialing of existing 304 numbers took effect on February 28, 2009. New numbers for area code 681 became available on March 28, 2009, one month after the start of mandatory ten-digit dialing. A telephone number (681-990-TEST (8378)) for testing proper routing to the new area code from any West Virginia telephone number went into service on December 28, 2008, and remained active through June 28, 2009.

NPA 304 central offices

NPA 681 central offices
NOTE: Prefix 976 is assigned to Charleston, and requires dialing 1-681 first.

References

External links

Telecommunications-related introductions in 1947
Telecommunications-related introductions in 2009
304
304